Stepan Alekseevich Shalaev (5 January 1929 – 18 January 2022) was a Soviet-Russian politician.

A member of the Communist Party, he served as Minister of Timber, Paper and Wood Processing Industry from 1980 to 1982 and chaired the All-Union Central Council of Trade Unions from 1982 to 1990. He died in Moscow on 18 January 2022, at the age of 93.

References

1929 births
2022 deaths
Central Committee of the Communist Party of the Soviet Union members
Central Committee of the Communist Party of the Soviet Union candidate members
Members of the Congress of People's Deputies of the Soviet Union
Presidium of the Supreme Soviet
Tenth convocation members of the Supreme Soviet of the Soviet Union
Eleventh convocation members of the Supreme Soviet of the Soviet Union
Moscow State Forest University alumni
Recipients of the Order of the Red Banner of Labour